A number of United Kingdom food and drink products have been granted protected geographical status under UK law and European Union law. Protection of geographical indications is granted to names that indicate geographical origin both inside and outside the United Kingdom. A number of geographical indications for food and drink products originating in the Crown dependencies, which are not part of the UK, are also protected under the British law. These are also listed in this article.

The stated purpose of the quality schemes is to protect the reputation of regional products, promote traditional and agricultural activity and to eliminate non-genuine products, which may mislead consumers or be of inferior or different character; for example, producers cannot refer to their product as Scotch whisky unless it has been produced within Scotland, following particular methods. The quality schemes include two types of geographical indicators: "protected designation of origin" (PDO) (which are appellations of origin) and "protected geographical indication" (PGI) (which are geographical indications). These two types of designations are available for food, agricultural products and wines. For spirit drinks and aromatised wine, the equivalent designation to a PGI is called a "geographical indication" (GI). In addition, the quality schemes also include "traditional specialities guaranteed" (TSG), which are designed to promote and protect names of quality agricultural products and foodstuffs without requiring any reference to geographical origin.

The United Kingdom and the Crown dependencies together have a total of 70 products with protected status. This is relatively few when compared with Portugal (125 protected status products), France (217) and Italy (267). However, the UK and Crown dependencies have considerably more designations than many other countries, including Ireland (5), Sweden (6), Turkey (15), Austria (14), or (for example) the United States, Japan or Korea (none). Most of the products hold either PGI (40 in the UK and 38 in the EU) or PDO (26 in the UK, 25 in the EU) status, with only 5 products  being designated as TSG.

This list, excepting "spirit drinks", is compiled according to the Database of Origin and Registration and E-Bacchus, European Commission databases of all registered products, as well as all products which were formerly registered or for which registration has been applied. The majority of products that hold protected status are foodstuffs fit for human consumption, including cheeses (15), fresh meat and offal (15),  meat products (4), fish and molluscs (10), fruit and vegetables (8), wines (5) and spirit drinks (3). While other agricultural products can be included, native Shetland wool is the only non-edible UK product name to hold protected status in the UK and the EU.

Legislation

Introduction as EU member state (applicable in the UK until 2021)
The schemes were introduced by the European Union, while the United Kingdom was a member, in 1993. From 2012 they were governed by Regulation (EU) No 1151/2012 of the European Parliament and of the Council, in part to overhaul and regulate the protected status system. Spirits, fortified wines and aromatised wines, described by the European Commission as "spirit drinks", were governed by a separate regulation, Regulation (EC) No 110/2008 of the European Parliament and of the Council.

The EU uses three different protected status schemes, which provide differing characteristics and levels and types of protection. 
Protected Designation of Origin (PDO): this designation covers products that are "produced, processed and prepared" in a specific area, using a particular, usually traditional, method.
Protected Geographical Indication (PGI): this designation covers products whose "production, processing or preparation" takes places in a specific area.
Traditional Speciality Guaranteed (TSG): this designation covers products with a "traditional character" or "customary names", distinguishing them from similar products. Unlike PDO and PGI, these products do not need to be connected to a specific area or method of production. In order to be considered for TSG status, a product must demonstrate that the materials and methods used in its production has been consistent for a minimum of 30 years.

Application under UK law (applicable in England, Scotland and Wales since 2021)

After the United Kingdom's withdrawal from the European Union and the transition period (which ended on 31 December 2020), the UK initiated a separate scheme governed by the same rules, which applies in England, Scotland and Wales.

The designations in effect on 31 December 2020 under the EU scheme (from any country), are since 2021 governed by UK law, which is an amended version of Regulation 1151/2021. Designations applied for under UK law since 1 January 2021, are not recognized in the EU, although an application for registration under EU law can still be made.

Application under EU law in the UK (applicable in Northern Ireland since 2021)

As a result of the Protocol on Ireland/Northern Ireland of the Withdrawal agreement, Northern Ireland remains covered by the EU scheme, and not the UK scheme. This means that for existing indications on 31 December 2020 the same indications are applicable as in other parts of the UK. However, new designations under EU law are automatically protected in Northern Ireland, while that is not the case for new designations under UK law. Furthermore, in Northern Ireland manufacturers are required to print the EU logos for the indications, rather than the UK logos.

Products with protected status
The categorisation below is based on the format used in the Database of Origin and Registration and E-Bacchus databases.

Fresh meat (and offal)

Meat products (cooked, salted, smoked, etc.)

Cheeses

Other products of animal origin (eggs, honey, various dairy products etc.)

Fruit, vegetables and cereals fresh or processed

Fresh fish, molluscs, and crustaceans and derivative products

Other products (spices etc.)

Beers

Bread, pastry, cakes, confectionery, biscuits and other baker’s wares

Wool

Wines

Spirit drinks

Products which formerly had protected status

List by country
PGI and PDO are linked to a geographical region and thus can be linked to a country. This is not necessarily the case for TSG products, where this is not a requirement. In the list below the geographical indications are grouped by country. For TSG, the grouping is with the location with which the product has most affinity.

See also
 Agriculture in the United Kingdom
 English cuisine
Northern Irish cuisine
Scottish cuisine
 Welsh cuisine
Cornish cuisine
 Wine from the United Kingdom
 List of Republic of Ireland food and drink products with protected status

Notes

References and sources

References

Sources

External links
 European Commission list of UK protected food
 REGULATION (EU) No 1151/2012 OF THE EUROPEAN PARLIAMENT AND OF THE COUNCIL

Agriculture in the United Kingdom

Protected status